Purépecha (also Pʼurhépecha ,  or Phorhépecha), often called Tarascan, which is a pejorative term coined by Spanish colonizers, is a language isolate or small language family that is spoken by some 140,000 Purépecha in the highlands of Michoacán, Mexico.

Purépecha was the main language of the pre-Columbian Tarascan State and became widespread in the region during its heyday in the late post-Classic period. The small town of Purepero got its name from the indigenous people who lived there. 

Even though it is spoken within the boundaries of Mesoamerica, Purépecha does not share many of the traits defining the Mesoamerican language area, suggesting that the language is a remnant of an indigenous pre-Aztec substrate that existed several thousands of years ago before the migration of speakers that contributed to the formation of the sprachbund, or alternatively is a relatively new arrival to the area.

Classification
Purépecha has long been classified as a language isolate unrelated to any other known language. That judgement is repeated in Lyle Campbell's authoritative classification. Joseph Greenberg assigned it to the Chibchan language family, but like the rest of his American classification, that proposal is rejected by specialists.

There are a number of dialects, which SIL International divides into two languages, but Campbell (1997) considers Purépecha to be a single language.

Demography
The language is spoken mostly in rural communities in the highlands of Michoacán. The former center of the Tarascan State was around Lake Pátzcuaro and remains an important center of the Purépecha community.

Ethnologue counts Purépecha as two languages: a central language, spoken by approximately 40,000 people (2005) around Pátzcuaro, and a western highland language, spoken by 135,000 speakers (2005) around Zamora, Los Reyes de Salgado, Paracho de Verduzco, and Pamatácuaro, all of which are in the vicinity of the volcano Parícutin. Recent migration has formed communities of speakers in the cities of Guadalajara, Tijuana and Mexico City and in the United States. The total population of speakers is rising (from 58,000 in 1960 to 96,000 in 1990 and 120,000 in 2000), but the percentage of speakers relative to non-speakers is falling, and the degree of bilingualism is rising, which makes it an endangered language. Fewer than 10% of speakers are now monolingual.

History

The Purépecha are known to have migrated from elsewhere to their current location, as their tradition includes stories of having traveled from the Pacific Ocean to their current locations. Ethnohistorical accounts mention them as a people dwelling in the same region of Michoacán they live in now as early as the 13th century. According to the Relación de Michoacán, the communities around Lake Pátzcuaro were gathered into the strong Purépecha State by the leader of the Uacúsecha group of Purépecha speakers, Tariácuri. Around 1300, he undertook the first conquests of other and installed his sons Hiripan and Tangáxoan as lords of Ihuatzio and Tzintzuntzan respectively while he himself ruled from Pátzcuaro City. By the time of the death of Taríacuri, in around 1350, his lineage was in control of all the major centers around Lake Pátzcuaro.

His son Hiripan continued the expansion into the area surrounding Lake Cuitzeo. In 1460 the Purépecha State reached the Pacific Coast at Zacatula, advanced into the Toluca Valley, and also, on the northern rim, reached into the present-day state of Guanajuato. In the 15th century, the Purépecha state was at war with the Aztecs. Many Nahua peoples who had lived side by side with Purépecha-speakers were relocated outside of the Tarascan frontiers, and Otomi-speakers fleeing the Aztec expansion resettled on the border between the two polities. That created a fairly homogeneous area of Purépecha speakers, with no other languages spoken in the core area around Lake Pátzcuaro.

During the Spanish conquest of the Aztec Empire, the Purépecha State was at first peacefully incorporated into the realm of New Spain, but with the killing of Cazonci Tangaxuán II by Nuño de Guzmán, the relation became one of Spanish dominance by force. Exceptions were the hospital communities of Vasco de Quiroga, such as Santa Fé de la Laguna, where Purépecha could live with a degree of protection from Spanish domination. Through Spanish friars, the Purépecha learned to write in the Latin script, and Purépecha became a literary language in the early colonial period. There is a body of written sources in Purépecha from the period, including several dictionaries, confessionaries, and land titles. Among the most important colonial works are the grammar (1558) and dictionary (1559) of Fray Maturino Gilberti, and the grammar and dictionary (1574) by Juan Baptista de Lagunas 

From ca. 1700, the status of Purépecha changed, and throughout the 20th century, the Mexican government pursued a policy of Hispanicization. Speakers of indigenous languages were actively encouraged to abandon their languages in favor of Spanish. However, in accord with international changes in favor of recognizing the linguistic rights of indigenous peoples and promoting multiculturalism in colonial states, the Congress of the Union of Mexico approved the General Law of Linguistic Rights of the Indigenous Peoples in 2003, giving Purépecha and Mexico's other indigenous languages official status as "national languages."

Orthography 

The official alphabet is the PURHEPECHA JIMBO KARARAKUECHA (Purépecha Alphabet):
a  b  ch  ch d  e  g  i  ï  j  k  k m  n  nh  o  p  p r  rh  s  t  t ts  ts u  x.

The letters b, d, g occur in spelling only after m, n: mb, nd, ng, which reflects the pronunciation of p, t, k after nasal consonants.

Phonology 
In all dialects of Purépecha, the stress accent is phonemic. As in Spanish orthography, a stressed syllable is indicated by the acute accent. Minimal pairs are formed: 
karáni 'write' — kárani 'fly'
p'amáni 'wrap it' — p'ámani 'touch a liquid'
Usually, the second syllable of the word is stressed, but occasionally, it is the first.

The phonemic inventory of the Tarécuato dialect is presented below. It differs from other dialects in having a velar nasal phoneme. The table of phonemes uses the International Phonetic Alphabet (IPA) and also gives the alphabet equivalents, enclosed in angle brackets, if it is not obvious.

Vowels

The two mid vowels  are uncommon, especially the latter.

The final vowel of a word is usually whispered or deleted except before a pause.

Vowel clusters are very rare except for sequences that are generated by adding grammatical suffixes like the plural -echa or -icha, the copula -i, or the genitive -iri. Vowel clusters are usually not the first two sounds of a word.

Consonants
Purépecha is one of the few languages in the Mesoamerica without a phonemic glottal stop (a distinction shared by the Huave language and by some Nahuan languages). It lacks any laterals ('l'-sounds). However, in the speech of many young speakers, the retroflex rhotic has been replaced by  under the influence of Spanish.

There are distinct series of nonaspirated and aspirated consonants and affricate consonants; aspiration is noted by an apostrophe. There are two rhotics ('r'-sounds, one of them being retroflex).

It uses the letter  for both  and the letter  for both , but both semivowels are fairly rare.

Intervocally, aspirated consonants become pre-aspirated. After nasals, they lose their aspiration entirely. Unaspirated consonants become voiced after nasals.

Grammar

Typology
Purépecha is an agglutinative language, but sound change has led to a certain degree of fusion. It is sometimes considered a polysynthetic language because of its complex morphology and frequent long words. Unlike most other languages that are considered polysynthetic, it has no noun compounding or incorporation. The language is exclusively suffixing and has a large number of suffixes (as many as 160) and clitics. The verb distinguishes 13 aspects and 6 modes. The language is double-marking in the typology of Johanna Nichols, as it marks grammatical relations on both the dependent phrases and phrasal heads.

The language has both grammatical case and postpositions. The case system distinguishes nominative, accusative, genitive, comitative, instrumental, and locative cases, but there are also many nominal derivational affixes. Word order is flexible, and the basic word order has been described as either SVO or SOV. However, most authors note that other word orders are frequently used for pragmatic purposes such as focus or topic tracking.

Nouns
Nouns are inflected by the basic formula Noun + Number + Case.

The language distinguishes between plural and unspecified numbers, with no dedicated singular form.

Plurals formed by the suffix -echa/-icha or -cha.
kúmi-wátsï  'fox' – kúmi-wátsïcha  'foxes'
iréta  'town' – irétaacha  'towns'
warhíticha tepharicha maru  'some fat women' (lit. women-PL fat-PL some).

The nominative case is unmarked. The accusative case (also called the objective case) is used to mark direct and sometimes indirect objects and is marked by the suffix -ni:

The genitive case is marked by -ri -eri: 

The locative case is marked by -rhu, -o

The instrumental case is marked by the particle jimpó or the suffix -mpu

The comitative case is marked by the particle jinkóni or the suffix -nkuni

Discourse-pragmatic focus on a noun or noun phrase is indicated by the clitic -sï.

Verbs
Verbs inflect for aspects and moods as well as for person and number of the subject and the object. There are also a number of suffixes expressing shape, position, or body parts that affect or are affected by the verbal action.

Transitivity is manipulated by suffixes forming transitive verbs with applicative or causative meaning or intransitives with passive or inchoative meanings.

Media
Purépecha-language programming is broadcast by the radio station XEPUR-AM, located in Cherán, Michoacán. It is a project of the National Commission for the Development of Indigenous Peoples.

Toponyms
 Acuitzio – "Place of the snakes"
 Cuerámaro – "Coat of the swamps"
 Cóporo – "Over the big road"
 Cupareo – "Crossroads"
 Tzintzuntzan – "Place of hummingbirds"
 Zurumuato – "Place in straw hill"

References

Bibliography

External links

 Purépecha Swadesh list of basic vocabulary words (from Wiktionary's Swadesh-list appendix)
Field recordings of Purépecha carried out by linguist William Shipley, archived at the Berkeley Language Center
The P'urhépecha WEB page From Michoacán, México. (In Spanish)

 
Indigenous languages of Mexico
Mesoamerican languages
Purépecha
Agglutinative languages
Language isolates of North America
Endangered language isolates
Endangered indigenous languages of the Americas